Events from the year 1802 in Canada.

Incumbents
Monarch: George III

Federal government
Parliament of Lower Canada: 3rd
Parliament of Upper Canada: 3rd

Governors
Governor of the Canadas: Robert Milnes
Governor of New Brunswick: Thomas Carleton
Governor of Nova Scotia: John Wentworth
Commodore-Governor of Newfoundland: Charles Morice Pole
Governor of St. John's Island: Edmund Fanning

Events
 The Tlingit start resisting Russian incursions into their territory.
 First Nations massacre Russians at Old Sitka; only a few survive.
 Alexander Mackenzie is knighted for his efforts in 1802 and becomes a member of the XY Company.
 Saint Mary's University is founded at Halifax.

Births

January 9 – Catharine Parr Traill, writer (d.1899) 
March 4 – Samuel Harrison, farmer, lawyer, mill owner, politician, judge and 1st Joint Premiers of the Province of Canada (d.1867)
May 2 – Étienne Parent, journalist (d.1874)
July 9 – Edmond Baird, cabinet-maker and upholsterer (d.1859)
October 31 – Charles Dickson Archibald, lawyer, businessman and politician (d.1868)

Full date unknown
Henry Sherwood, lawyer, local politician and 4th Premier of Canada West (d.1855)

Deaths
April 3 – Philippe-François de Rastel de Rocheblave, soldier, businessman and political figure in Lower Canada (b. 1727)

References

 
02